Fundex Games, Ltd. was an American toy and game company based in Plainfield, Indiana. Founded in 1986, Fundex Games produced many different games including card games, dice games, domino-based games, magic tricks, board games, and children's toys. Fundex also produced a line of outdoor lawn and tailgate games. Fundex Games was founded by Peter Voigt and his son, Chip Voigt.

Fundex Games had an exclusive partnership with the Professional Domino Association to market PDA-licensed domino games and other products for the United States market. Fundex's best selling game was Phase 10, which is the second best selling cardgame in the world, behind Uno. The rights to Phase 10 were sold to Uno-maker Mattel in 2010.

In 2012, Fundex Games filed for bankruptcy in the Southern District of Indiana. The assets of the company were acquired in a bankruptcy auction by Poof-Slinky, Inc.

Awards
Fundex Games was awarded numerous iParenting Media Awards for its products: five awards for Hottest Products for 2004 and one award for Best Products of 2006. Additionally, Fundex Games earned an Oppenheim Toy Portfolio Platinum Award in 2006 for Alfredo's Food Fight, a board game for young children and Highrise a family Domino Game.

Products

Card games
 Heist
 Hit the Deck
 Phase 10
 Rage
 Shoot the Moon
 Monte Carlo Playing Cards

Children's games
Children's games
Peanut Butter & Jelly
Don't Cut the Cheese
Don't Tip the Waiter
My MASH Game
What's In Ned's Head?
Monster Under My Bed
A to Z Jr.
Alfredo's Food Fight
Goosebumps Welcome to Horrorland
Thumb Decks
Thumb Decks Collectible Cards Assortment
Lunch Box games
Cookin' Cookies
Peanut Butter & Jelly
Wormy Apples Game
The Storybook Game
Jelly Bean Jumble Game
Pinkalicious Pinkerella Game

Dice games
 Phase 10 Dice
 Swipe
 Sting
 Shake
 Bowling Dice

Board games
 Alfredo's Food Fight
 What's in Ned's Head?
 Monster Under my Bed
 Gassy Gus
 Gnip Gnop
 Mancala
 Paddle Pool
 Booby Trap
 Sputnik
 Top Spot
 Chairs
 Hot Potato
 A to Z
 Phase 10 Twist

Domino games
 Highrise
 Mexican Train
 Wildfire
 High Five

Outdoor games
 Recreaction Branded Games
 Chuck-O Pro
 Top Toss (ladder toss game)
 Bulls-Eye Washers
 Bagball
 Score Station

References

External links
 Fundex at Board Game Geek

Card game publishing companies
Game manufacturers
Toy companies established in 1986
Manufacturing companies based in Indiana
Toy companies of the United States
1986 establishments in Indiana